Splitrock is an abandoned townsite in Beaver Bay Township, Lake County, Minnesota, United States; located at the mouth of the Split Rock River.

It was inhabited from 1899 to 1906 as a company town to house workers for a logging operation. The site is now within the borders of Split Rock Lighthouse State Park.

History
Splitrock was developed as a logging camp by the Split Rock Lumber Company, a subsidiary of the Merrill and Ring Lumber Company.  About 350 men worked in the Split Rock River valley felling red and white pine.  The lumber company controlled the town's harbor, railroad, coal dock, and store (which included a post office). Early maps show the community as Splitrock, Split Rock, Split Rock Point, or Waterville.

Although the railroad never connected to any other lines, it was incorporated as the Split Rock and Northern Railroad to qualify for a common carrier tax break. The logs were sluiced from a dammed area at the river mouth into the lake, where they were rounded up into rafts and towed to a sawmill in Duluth by the company's tugboat Gladiator. Unusually, the Gladiator stocked carrier pigeons to carry distress messages to the company office.

By 1906 the operation had cut  of lumber, netting a highly successful profit of $863,454. With most of the valuable timber gone, logging operations ceased and the town and railroad were dismantled the following year. The cutover land suffered further from multiple forest fires.

References

Company towns in Minnesota
Former populated places in Lake County, Minnesota
Ghost towns in Minnesota
Populated places established in 1899
Logging communities in the United States